Betão is the Portuguese word for concrete. Betão may also refer to:

People
Betão (futsal player) (born 1978), born Adalberto Nunes da Silva, Brazilian futsal player
Betão (defender) (born 1983), born Ebert William Amâncio, Brazilian footballer
Betão (midfielder) (born 1983), born Everton da Silva Oliveira, Brazilian footballer
Betão (footballer, born 1989), Gilberto Barbosa Nunes Filho, Brazilian football defender

Other
Betão Ronca Ferro, 1970 Brazilian comendy film